Kyron Brown (born May 26, 1996) is an American football cornerback who is a free agent. He played college football at Akron, and signed with the New York Jets as an undrafted free agent in 2019.

College career
Brown was a member of the Akron Zips for five seasons, redshirting his true freshman season. He recorded 121 tackles, six interceptions, 1 forced fumble and 25 passes defensed in 51 games played (26 starts).

Professional career

New York Jets
Brown signed with the New York Jets as an undrafted free agent on May 10, 2019. He was cut at the end of training camp during final roster cuts, but was re-signed by the Jets to their practice squad on September 1, 2019. Brown was promoted to the Jets' active roster on November 13, 2019. Brown made his NFL debut on November 17, 2019 against the Washington Redskins, playing ten snaps on special teams in a 34-17 victory. Brown made his first career start on December 8 against the Miami Dolphins, making five tackles before leaving the game due to a quad injury. He was placed on injured reserve on December 9, 2019. Brown was waived with a failed physical designation on May 5, 2020. He reverted to the reserve/physically unable to perform list the next day after clearing waivers. He was waived after the season on May 7, 2021.

Dallas Cowboys
On July 26, 2021, Brown signed a two-year deal with the Dallas Cowboys. He was waived on August 17. He was re-signed to the practice squad on September 1. He signed a reserve/future contract with the Cowboys on January 18, 2022. He was waived/injured on August 15, 2022 and placed on injured reserve. He was released on August 23.

Tennessee Titans
On October 18, 2022, Brown was signed to the Titans practice squad.

References

External links
Akron Zips bio

1996 births
Living people
Akron Zips football players
American football cornerbacks
Dallas Cowboys players
New York Jets players
Tennessee Titans players
Players of American football from Florida
Sportspeople from Boynton Beach, Florida